Elections to South Ribble Borough Council were held on 5 May 1983. The whole council was up for election and the Conservative Party retained its majority. The elections were the last to be held under the old boundaries, with new boundaries for the Borough Council and its wards coming into effect for the 1983 Borough Council elections.

Election result

|}

Ward Results

References
 The Elections Centre, South Ribble Borough Council Election Results (PDF)

1983 English local elections
1983
1980s in Lancashire